The Vintage Sports-Car Club or VSCC is an active British motor racing club that organises events, both competitive and social, throughout the United Kingdom. These are primarily, but not exclusively for pre-1940 cars.

In 2019, (thus prior to the Covid 19 disruptions), 43 events were held in Scotland, England and Wales.

Race Meetings were organised at venues including Silverstone (Spring Start in April), Oulton Park, and Donington Park.

Sporting Trials were held at off-road venues including the Scottish Trial, Derbyshire, Herefordshire, Welsh, Lakeland and Cotswold Trials.

Speed Hill Climbs and Sprints were held at Brooklands, Shelsley Walsh, Prescott, Brands Hatch, Loton Park and Bicester Heritage.

Competitive Navigation Rallies, open to all pre-war cars, included events held in Leicester-shire, Hertford-shire and Wales.

Non-competitive social runs were held in several areas including Scotland and more informally, there are many monthly pub meets attended by members and throughout the land.

The Club was established in October 1934 by five founder members: Colin Nicholson, Bruce Nicholson, Ned Lewis, Harry Bowler and Vivian Brookes. The VSCC was known initially as the Veteran Sports-Car Club, but within a month, by November 1934, was known as The Vintage Sports-Car Club, to avoid confusion with the Veteran Car Club of Great Britain.

Its aim was to promote the pastime of motoring- the VSCC was first started in order to allow the "not so rich" to enjoy historic motoring. Tim Carson joined the committee in 1935 and Tom Rolt in 1938, with S. C. H. Davis having become president in 1937.

Established guidelines made the club principally for cars built before 1931.  This generally remains in force, although cars built before the Second World War but conforming to standards set in 1931 are also allowed to compete.

As well as social events (tours, and 'Concours' gatherings), the club, which has a membership of some 5,600, organises a range of motoring competitions such as driving tests, hill climbs, races, road rallies, trials and sprints.  Their most famous race is held at Silverstone Circuit in April of every year.

Notes

External links 
Club website
Club Page on ClassicRallies

Motorsport organisations in the United Kingdom
Auto racing teams established in 1934
Motor clubs
Historic motorsport events